The Xuzhou Olympic Sports Centre Stadium is a sports venue in Xuzhou, Jiangsu, China. It has a capacity of 35,000 and it is used mostly for football matches. It is also used for athletics.

References

Football venues in China
Multi-purpose stadiums in China
Buildings and structures in Xuzhou
Sports venues in Jiangsu